This page includes the discography of Greek singer Eleftheria Arvanitaki.

Albums

She also took part in four more albums with "Opisthodromiki Kompania".

CD Singles

Compilations

Soundtracks

See also

Arvanitaki, Eleftheria
Pop music discographies
Folk music discographies